Heroes of Jin Yong, first published in 1996, is a tactical role-playing game based on the storyline and characters in Jin Yong's Wuxia novels, developed by Heluo Studio (later known as Oriental Algorithm System).

In the game, the player takes on the role of present-day protagonist, who wakes up one day to find himself in the ancient Chinese Jianghu (martial arts world). The player learns that in order to return to modern society, he must find all the fourteen novels by Jin Yong and be declared champion of the Jianghu. The books are scattered around the Jianghu and the player must interact with many characters from the novels, each with his / her own story to tell. Some characters are friendly and willing to help the player in his quest, while others are hostile and fight with him. The player must learn his own martial arts in order to coerce or persuade others to give him the books. There are a wide variety of martial arts styles and weapons available, including sword, saber, whip, and palm styles. The player can also choose to follow a righteous or evil path through his actions and deeds, with different reactions from characters depending on what path he takes.

Online version
The massive multiplayer online version (金庸群俠傳Online) was published by Chinesegamer International Corp. Version 1.0 was released in June, 2001, and version 2.0 was released in December, 2004.

Legacy
A sequel titled Wulin Qunxia Zhuan was developed by Heluo Studio and published by Softworld in 2001. A remake of the game under the title of Tale of Wuxia was released in Chinese on 28 July 2015, and later on Steam in both Chinese and English on 28 April 2016.<ref>{{cite web |url=http://wulin.fhyx.com/news/150322/25.html |title=Heluo's New Wulin Qunxia Zhuan has received an official title change to Xiake Fengyun Zhuan|date=2015-03-22|publisher=Phoenix Publishing & Media Group|accessdate=2015-03-22|language=zh}}</ref> A standalone prequel to Tale of Wuxia was released in 2017 under the title Tale of Wuxia: The Pre-Sequel.

Another sequel to Heroes of Jin Yong was released in 2018 under the title Ho Tu Lo Shu: The Books of Dragon on the Chinese Cube Game platform, and later on Steam with only Chinese language support.

 Fan works Heroes of Jin Yong 2 is a browser game developed by an independent Chinese gaming developer, 半瓶神仙醋, with Adobe Flash. The game was released on 24 December 2006 for free and gained popularity on Chinese gaming platforms. 

See alsoDragon OathMartial KingdomsXuanyuan JianThe Legend of Sword and FairyJade EmpireBujingaiHeavenly Sword''

References

External links

CIC Jinyong 1.x online page
CIC Jinyong 2.0 online page

1996 video games
Adaptations of works by Jin Yong
Chinese-language-only video games
DOS games
DOS-only games
Single-player video games
Soft-World games
Video games based on novels
Video games developed in Taiwan
Wuxia video games